Mitchell Froom (born June 29, 1953) is an American musician and record producer. He was a member of the bands Gamma and Latin Playboys, and is currently the keyboardist for Crowded House. He has produced albums for several artists, including Richard Thompson, Los Lobos, Suzanne Vega, and Vonda Shepard.

Career
Froom began his career as a keyboard player in Sonoma County, California. The band Crossfire featured two keyboard players; Mitchell on one side of the stage and brother David on the other with Gary Pihl on guitar.  He also played keyboards on the Ronnie Montrose-led group Gamma's third album Gamma 3, as well as It's a Beautiful Day's David LaFlamme's 1978 solo album Inside Out.

He produced the first three Crowded House albums, which led to more production jobs with Richard Thompson, Los Lobos, American Music Club, Suzanne Vega and Paul McCartney. In 1982, Froom scored the adult film Café Flesh; his soundtrack was later released as the album Key of Cool. In the late 1980s, Crowded House leader Neil Finn invited Froom to join the band as an official member, but Froom declined due to his producing career.

In 1987 he produced and wrote incidental music for the neo-noir film Slam Dance.

Between 1992 and 2002 Froom formed a full-time partnership with engineer Tchad Blake. Production credits include albums from American Music Club, Stevie Ann, Tasmin Archer, The Bangles, Peter Case, The Corrs, Elvis Costello, Sheryl Crow, Crowded House, The Ditty Bops, Tim Finn, Missy Higgins, Indigo Girls, Los Lobos, Robin Gibb, Maria McKee, Pat McLaughlin, Randy Newman, Nerina Pallot, Pearl Jam, Phantom Planet, Bonnie Pink, Daniel Powter, Bonnie Raitt, Ron Sexsmith, The Del Fuegos, Richard Thompson, and Suzanne Vega. Froom and Blake joined with David Hidalgo and Louie Perez of Los Lobos to form the experimental roots collaboration Latin Playboys.

Froom has produced over 60 albums
and has composed and produced music for numerous films. He has been nominated for several Grammys including for Record of the Year for La Bamba by Los Lobos (1988) and Producer of the Year in 1993 for both Kiko by Los Lobos and 99.9F° by Suzanne Vega. He was also nominated for the 1998 Golden Globe Award and the 1999 Grammy for 
Best Song Written for a Motion Picture, Television or Other Visual Media
for co-writing with Sheryl Crow the James Bond movie title song "Tomorrow Never Dies".

As a musician, Froom has released two solo albums, Dopamine (1998) and A Thousand Days (2005). The song "Noodletown" from "Dopamine" won an Emmy when it was used as the theme for PBS' Sessions at West 54th.

Froom was a judge for the 2nd annual Independent Music Awards to support independent artists' careers.

In December 2019 Froom was announced as a member of the new lineup of Crowded House. The first album with this lineup, Dreamers Are Waiting, was released on June 4, 2021.

Personal life
Froom is of Romanian ancestry. His brother is David Froom, a classical composer and Department Chair of the Music Department at St. Mary's College of Maryland.

His first wife was Connie Jester, with whom he had a daughter Charlotte Froom (born 1986). Charlotte was the bassist in The Like.

Froom married Suzanne Vega in 1995; they separated and divorced in 1998. Soul Coughing's 1994 album, Ruby Vroom, was named after their daughter, Ruby Froom (born July 8, 1994).

He married Vonda Shepard in 2004. They have a son, Jack Froom (April 15, 2006), named for Froom's late father, a noted physician and educator.

Discography 

With Crowded House
 Crowded House (Capitol Records, 1986)
 Temple of Low Men (Capitol Records, 1988)
 Woodface (Capitol Records, 1991)
 Dreamers Are Waiting (BMG Rights Management, 2021)

With Vonda Shepard
 The Radical Light (Reprise/Warner Bros. Records, 1992)
 By 7:30 (Jacket Records, 1999)
 Chinatown (Edel Records, 2002)
 From the Sun (Redeye Distribution, 2008)

With Bob Dylan
 Down in the Groove (Columbia Records, 1988)

With Bonnie Raitt
 Longing in Their Hearts (Capitol Records, 1994)
 Fundamental (Capitol Records, 1998)
 Silver Lining (Capitol Records, 2002)
 Souls Alike (Capitol Records, 2005)

With Boris Grebenshchikov
 Salt (2014)

With Daniel Powter
 Daniel Powter (Warner Bros. Records, 2005)

With Rita Coolidge
 Inside the Fire (A&M Records, 1984)

With Rufus Wainwright
 Unfollow the Rules (BMG, 2020)

With Indigo Girls
 Poseidon and the Bitter Bug (Vanguard Records, 2009)

With Susanna Hoffs
 Someday (Baroque Folk, 2012)

With Tasmin Archer
 Bloom (EMI, 1996)

With Randy Newman
 Bad Love (Dreamworks Records, 1999)
 Harps and Angels (Nonesuch Records, 2008)
 Dark Matter (Nonesuch Records, 2017)

With Maria McKee
 Maria McKee (Geffen, 1989)

With Tracy Chapman
 Where You Live (Elektra Records, 2005)

With Marshall Crenshaw
 Downtown (Warner Bros. Records, 1985)

With Roy Orbison
 Mystery Girl (Virgin Records, 1989)

With Eddie Money
 Where's the Party? (Columbia Records, 1983)

With Sheryl Crow
 Sheryl Crow (A&M Records, 1996)
 The Globe Sessions (A&M Records, 1998)

With Neil Finn
 Try Whistling This (Parlophone Records, 1998)
 One Nil (Parlophone Records, 2001)

With Tracy Bonham
 Down Here (Island Records, 2000)
 Blink the Brightest (Zoe Records, 2005)

With Tim Finn
 Tim Finn (Capitol Records, 1989)

With Finn Brothers
 Everyone is Here (Nettwerk/Parlophone Records, 2004)

With Paul McCartney
 Flowers in the Dirt (Parlophone Records, 1989)

With Peter Gabriel
 Up (Geffen, 2002)

References

External links 

Mitchell Froom at Discogs

1953 births
Record producers from California
20th-century American keyboardists
American people of Romanian descent
Living people
People from Sonoma County, California
Slash Records artists
Latin Playboys members
Gamma (band) members